Tene may refer to:

Places
Tene, Mali, a commune in Mali
Těně, a municipality in the Czech Republic
Teneh Omarim, also known as Tene, an Israeli settlement
Tenerife, Spain

People
Florin Tene, a Romanian footballer

Archaeology
La Tène (archaeological site)
La Tène culture, an Iron Age culture